Taenaris myops is a butterfly of the family Nymphalidae.

Subspecies
Taenaris myops myops - Aru
Taenaris myops kirschii (Staudinger, 1887) - SE.New Guinea, E.Papua, SE.Papua, Yule I.
Taenaris myops praxedes Fruhstorfer, 1904 - Salawati
Taenaris myops parallelus Rothschild, 1916 - Misool, Waigeu
Taenaris myops merana Fruhstorfer, 1904 - NW.West Irian
Taenaris myops maneta Hulstaert, 1923 - S.West Irian (Merauke)
Taenaris myops vanhaasterti Hulstaert, 1925 - SE.West Irian
Taenaris myops ansuna Fruhstorfer, 1904 - Jobi I.
Taenaris myops phrixus Brooks, 1950 - West Irian (Dore Bay)
Taenaris myops rothschildi Grose-Smith, 1894 - Humboldt Bay
Taenaris myops wahnesi Heller, 1894 - N.New Guinea (coast)
Taenaris myops miscus Fruhstorfer, 1905 - Normanby, Goodenough I.
Taenaris myops fergussonia Fruhstorfer, 1904 - Fergusson, Trobriand, Woodlark I.

Description
Wings are fuliginous grey. Upperside of each hindwing has one ocellated spot, while undersides of each hinding show two large bright eyepots, of which the centre is blackish with a small white central eye, surrounded with a pale fulvous ring.

Distribution
This species can be found in New Guinea.

References

External links
 PNG Nature

Taenaris
Butterflies described in 1860
Butterflies of Oceania
Taxa named by Baron Cajetan von Felder
Taxa named by Rudolf Felder